The American Federation of Labor and Congress of Industrial Organizations (AFL–CIO) is  the largest federation of unions in the United States. It is made up of 60 national and international unions, together representing more than 12 million active and retired workers. The AFL–CIO engages in substantial political spending and activism, typically in support of progressive and pro-labor policies.

The AFL–CIO was formed in 1955 when the American Federation of Labor and the Congress of Industrial Organizations merged after a long estrangement. Union membership in the US peaked in 1979, when the AFL–CIO's affiliated unions had nearly twenty million members. From 1955 until 2005, the AFL–CIO's member unions represented nearly all unionized workers in the United States. Several large unions split away from AFL–CIO and formed the rival Change to Win Federation in 2005, although a number of those unions have since re-affiliated, and many locals of Change to Win are either part of or work with their local central labor councils. The largest unions currently in the AFL–CIO are the American Federation of Teachers (AFT) with approximately 1.7 million members,  American Federation of State, County and Municipal Employees (AFSCME), with approximately 1.4 million members, and United Food and Commercial Workers with 1.2 million members.

Membership 

The AFL–CIO is a federation of international labor unions. As a voluntary federation, the AFL–CIO has little authority over the affairs of its member unions except in extremely limited cases (such as the ability to expel a member union for corruption and enforce resolution of disagreements over jurisdiction or organizing). As of September 2020, the AFL–CIO had 56 member unions representing 12.1 million members.

Political activities 
The AFL–CIO was a major component of the New Deal Coalition that dominated politics into the mid-1960s. Although it has lost membership, finances, and political clout since 1970, it remains a major player on the liberal side of national politics, with a great deal of activity in lobbying, grassroots organizing, coordinating with other liberal organizations, fund-raising, and recruiting and supporting candidates around the country.

In recent years the AFL–CIO has concentrated its political efforts on lobbying in Washington and the state capitals, and on "GOTV" (get-out-the-vote) campaigns in major elections. For example, in the 2010 midterm elections, it sent 28.6 million pieces of mail. Members received a "slate card" with a list of union endorsements matched to the member's congressional district, along with a "personalized" letter from President Obama emphasizing the importance of voting. In addition, 100,000 volunteers went  door-to-door to promote endorsed candidates to 13 million union voters in 32 states.

Governance 
The AFL–CIO is governed by its members, who meet in a quadrennial convention. Each member union elects delegates, based on proportional representation. The AFL–CIO's state federations, central and local labor councils, constitutional departments, and constituent groups are also entitled to delegates. The delegates elect officers and vice presidents, debate and approve policy, and set dues.

Annual meetings 
From 1951 to 1996, the Executive Council held its winter meeting in the resort town of Bal Harbour, Florida. The meeting at the Bal Harbour Sheraton has been the object of frequent criticism, including over a labor dispute at the hotel itself.

Citing image concerns, the council changed the meeting site to Los Angeles. However, the meeting was moved back to Bal Harbour several years later.   The 2012 meeting was held in Orlando, Florida.

State and local bodies 
The AFL–CIO constitution permits international unions to pay state federation and CLC dues directly, rather than have each local or state federation pay them. This relieves each union's state and local affiliates of the administrative duty of assessing, collecting and paying the dues. International unions assess the AFL–CIO dues themselves, and collect them on top of their own dues-generating mechanisms or simply pay them out of the dues the international collects. But not all international unions pay their required state federation and CLC dues.

Constitutional departments 
One of the most well-known departments was the Industrial Union Department (IUD). It had been constitutionally mandated by the new AFL–CIO constitution created by the merger of the AFL and CIO in 1955, as CIO unions felt that the AFL's commitment to industrial unionism was not strong enough to permit the department to survive without a constitutional mandate. For many years, the IUD was a de facto organizing department in the AFL–CIO. For example, it provided money to the near-destitute American Federation of Teachers (AFT) as it attempted to organize the United Federation of Teachers in 1961. The organizing money enabled the AFT to win the election and establish its first large collective bargaining affiliate. For many years, the IUD remained rather militant on a number of issues.

There are six AFL–CIO constitutionally mandated departments:
 Building and Construction Trades Department, AFL–CIO
 Maritime Trades Department, AFL–CIO
 Metal Trades Department, AFL–CIO
 Department for Professional Employees, AFL–CIO
 Transportation Trades Department, AFL–CIO
 Union Label Department, AFL–CIO

Constituency groups 
Constituency groups are nonprofit organizations chartered and funded by the AFL–CIO as voter registration and mobilization bodies. These groups conduct research, host training and educational conferences, issue research reports and publications, lobby for legislation and build coalitions with local groups. Each constituency group has the right to sit in on AFL–CIO executive council meetings, and to exercise representational and voting rights at AFL–CIO conventions.

The AFL–CIO's seven constituency groups include the A. Philip Randolph Institute, the AFL–CIO Union Veterans Council, the Asian Pacific American Labor Alliance, the Coalition of Black Trade Unionists, the Coalition of Labor Union Women, the Labor Council for Latin American Advancement and Pride at Work.

Allied organizations 
The Working for America Institute started out as a department of the AFL–CIO. Established in 1958, it was previously known as the Human Resources Development Institute (HRDI). John Sweeney renamed the department and spun it off as an independent organization in 1998 to act as a lobbying group to promote economic development, develop new economic policies, and lobby Congress on economic policy. The American Center for International Labor Solidarity started out as the Free Trade Union Committee (FTUC), which internationally promoted free labor-unions.

Other organizations that are allied with the AFL–CIO include:
 Alliance for Retired Americans
 Solidarity Center
 American Rights at Work
 International Labor Communications Association
 Jobs with Justice
 Labor Heritage Foundation
 Labor and Working-Class History Association
 National Day Laborer Organizing Network
 United Students Against Sweatshops
 Working America
 Working for America Institute
 Ohio Organizing Collaborative

Programs 
Programs are organizations established and controlled by the AFL–CIO to serve certain organizational goals. Programs of the AFL–CIO include the AFL–CIO Building Investment Trust, the AFL–CIO Employees Federal Credit Union, the AFL–CIO Housing Investment Trust, the National Labor College and Union Privilege.

International policy 
The AFL–CIO is affiliated to the Brussels-based International Trade Union Confederation, formed November 1, 2006. The new body incorporated the member organizations of the International Confederation of Free Trade Unions, of which the AFL–CIO had long been part.  The AFL–CIO had had a very active foreign policy in building and strengthening free trade unions. During the Cold War, it vigorously opposed Communist unions in Latin America and Europe. In opposing Communism, it helped split the CGT in France and helped create the anti-Communist Force Ouvrière.

According to the cybersecurity firm Area 1, hackers working for the People's Liberation Army Strategic Support Force compromised the networks of the AFL–CIO in order to gain information on negotiations for the Trans-Pacific Partnership.

History

Civil rights 

The AFL–CIO has a long relationship with civil rights struggles. One of the major points of contention between the AFL and the CIO, particularly in the era immediately after the CIO split off, was the CIO's willingness to include black workers (excluded by the AFL in its focus on craft unionism.) Later, blacks would also criticize the CIO for abandoning their interests, particularly after the merger with the AFL.

In 1961, Martin Luther King Jr. gave a speech titled "If the Negro Wins, Labor Wins" to the organization's convention in Bal Harbour, Florida. King hoped for a coalition between civil rights and labor that would improve the situation for the entire working class by ending racial discrimination. However, King also criticized the AFL–CIO for its tolerance of unions that excluded black workers. "I would be lacking in honesty," he told the delegates of the 1965 Illinois AFL–CIO Convention during his keynote address, "if I did not point out that the labor movement of thirty years ago did more in that period for civil rights than labor is doing today...Our combined strength is potentially enormous, but we have not used a fraction of it for our own good or the needs of society as a whole." King and the AFL–CIO diverged further in 1967, when King announced his opposition to the Vietnam War, which the AFL–CIO strongly supported. The AFL–CIO endorsed the Civil Rights Act of 1964.

Police violence

In the 21st Century, the AFL–CIO has been criticized by campaigners against police violence for its affiliation with the International Union of Police Associations (IUPA). On May 31, 2020, the AFL–CIO offices in Washington, DC, were set on fire during the George Floyd protests taking place in the city. In response, AFL–CIO president Richard Trumka condemned both the murder of George Floyd and the destruction of the offices, but did not address demands to end the organization's affiliation with the IUPA.

Triumph and disaster: the politics of the 1960s
After the smashing reelection victory of President Lyndon B. Johnson in 1964, the heavily Democratic Congress passed a raft of liberal legislation. Labor union leaders claimed credit for the widest range of liberal laws since the New Deal era, including the Civil Rights Act of 1964; the Voting Rights Act of 1965; the War on Poverty; aid to cities and education; increased Social Security benefits; and Medicare for the elderly. The 1966 elections were an unexpected disaster, with defeats for many of the more liberal Democrats. According to Alan Draper, the AFL-CIO Committee on Political Action (COPE) was the main electioneering unit of the labor movement. It ignored the white backlash against civil rights. The COPE assumed falsely that union members were interested in issues of greatest salience to union leadership, but polls showed this was not true. The members were much more conservative. The younger ones were deeply concerned about taxes and crime, and the older ones had more conservative social views.  Furthermore a new issue--the War in Vietnam-- was bitterly splitting the New Deal coalition into hawks (led by Johnson and Vice-President Hubert Humphrey) and doves (led by Senators Eugene McCarthy and  Robert Kennedy).

New Unity Partnership 
In 2003, the AFL–CIO began an intense internal debate over the future of the labor movement in the United States with the creation of the New Unity Partnership (NUP), a loose coalition of some of the AFL–CIO's largest unions. This debate intensified in 2004, after the defeat of labor-backed candidate John Kerry in the November 2004 US presidential election. The NUP's program for reform of the federation included reduction of the central bureaucracy, more money spent on organizing new members rather than on electoral politics, and a restructuring of unions and locals, eliminating some smaller locals and focusing more along the lines of industrial unionism.

In 2005, the NUP dissolved and the Change to Win Federation (CtW) formed, threatening to secede from the AFL–CIO if its demands for major reorganization were not met. As the AFL–CIO prepared for its 50th anniversary convention in late July, three of the federations' four largest unions announced their withdrawal from the federation: the Service Employees International Union (SEIU), the International Brotherhood of Teamsters ("The Teamsters"), and the United Food and Commercial Workers International Union (UFCW). UNITE HERE disaffiliated in mid-September 2005, the United Farm Workers left in January 2006, and the Laborers' International Union of North America disaffiliated on June 1, 2006.

Two unions later left CtW and rejoined the AFL–CIO. After a bitter internal leadership dispute that involved allegations of embezzlement and accusations that SEIU was attempting to raid the union, a substantial number of UNITE HERE members formed their own union (Workers United) while the remainder of UNITE HERE reaffiliated with the AFL–CIO on September 17, 2009. The Laborers' International Union of North America said on August 13, 2010, that it would also leave Change to Win and rejoin the AFL–CIO in October 2010.

ILWU disaffiliation 
In August 2013, the International Longshore and Warehouse Union (ILWU) disaffiliated from the AFL–CIO. The ILWU said that members of other AFL–CIO unions were crossing its picket lines, and the AFL–CIO had done nothing to stop it. The ILWU also cited the AFL–CIO's willingness to compromise on key policies such as labor law reform, immigration reform, and health care reform. The longshoremen's union said it would become an independent union.

Leadership

Presidents 
 George Meany (1955–1979)
 Lane Kirkland (1979–1995)
 Thomas R. Donahue (1995)
 John J. Sweeney (1995–2009)
 Richard Trumka (2009–2021)
 Liz Shuler (2021–present)

Secretary-treasurers 
1955: William F. Schnitzler
1969: Lane Kirkland
1979: Thomas R. Donahue
1995: Barbara Easterling
1995: Richard Trumka
2009: Liz Shuler
2021: Fred Redmond

Executive vice presidents
1995: Linda Chavez-Thompson
2005: Arlene Holt Baker
2013: Tefere Gebre
2022:

See also 
 Labor history of the United States
 Directly affiliated local union
 Labor unions in the United States
 List of labor unions in the United States

References

Further reading 
 Amber, Michelle. "SEIU Agrees to Pay Nearly $4 Million to Settle Dispute With AFL-CIO Over Dues." Daily Labor Report. March 2, 2006.
 Arnesen, Eric, ed. Encyclopedia of U.S. Labor and Working-Class History (2006), 3 vol; 2064pp; 650 articles by experts 

 Draper, Alan. A rope of sand : the AFL-CIO Committee on Political Education, 1955-1967 (1989) online, the main electioneering unit of the AFL-CIO was ineffective.
 Draper, Alan. "Labor and the 1966 Elections," Labor History. (1989) 30#1 pp 76-92. Massive defeat for the liberal Democrats; polls show many union members uninterested in liberal goals of AFL-CIO, especially regarding civil rights.

 Gilroy, Tom. "Labor to Stress Get-Out-the-Vote Among Members in Fall Elections." Labor Relations Week. October 21, 1998.
 Greenhouse, Steven. "For Chairwoman of Breakaway Labor Coalition, Deep Roots in the Movement." New York Times. October 10, 2005.
 Lichtenstein, Nelson. "Two Roads Forward for Labor: The AFL-CIO's New Agenda." Dissent 61.1 (2014): 54–58.  Online
 Lichtenstein, Nelson. State of the Union: A Century of American Labor (2nd ed. 2013)
 Minchin, Timothy J. Labor under Fire: A History of the AFL-CIO since 1979 (U of North Carolina Press, 2017). xvi, 414 pp.
 Mort, Jo-Ann, ed. Not Your Father's Union Movement: Inside the AFL-CIO (2002)
 Rosenfeld, Jake. What Unions No Longer Do. (Harvard University Press, 2014) 
 Tillman, Ray M. and Michael S. Cummings. The Transformation of U.S. Unions: Voices, Visions, and Strategies from the Grassroots (1999)
 Yates, Michael D. Why Unions Matter (2009)

 Constitution 
 Constitution of the AFL-CIO, as amended at the Twenty-Fifth Constitutional Convention, July 25-28, 2005. Accessed January 15, 2007.

 Archives 
In 2013, the AFL-CIO named the University of Maryland Libraries as their official repository, succeeding the closed National Labor College.  The archival and library holdings were transferred in 2013, dating from the establishment of the AFL (1881), and offer almost complete records from the founding of the AFL-CIO (1955).  Among the estimated 40 million documents are AFL-CIO Department records, trade department records, international union records, union programs, union organizations with allied or affiliate relationships with the AFL-CIO, and personal papers of union leaders. Extensive photo documentation of labor union activities from the 1940s to the present are in the photographic negative and digital collections.  Additionally, collections of graphic images, over 10,000 audio tapes, several hundred films and videotapes, and over 2,000 artifacts are available for public research and study.

 AFL-CIO Region 9 Records. circa 1955-2000. 14.00 cubic feet (14 boxes). At the Labor Archives of Washington, University of Washington Libraries Special Collections.
 Preliminary Guide to the AFL-CIO King County Labor Council of Washington Provisional Trades Section Records. 1935-1971. .42 cubic foot (1 box). At the Labor Archives of Washington, University of Washington Libraries Special Collections.
 AFL-CIO, Washington State Labor Council Records. 1880-2010. 187.18 cubic feet. At the Labor Archives of Washington, University of Washington Libraries Special Collections.
 Washington State Federation of Labor Records. 1881-1967. 45.44 cubic feet (including 2 microfilm reels, 1 package, and 1 vertical file). At the Labor Archives of Washington, University of Washington Libraries Special Collections.
 Antonia Bohan 1995 AFL-CIO Convention Delegate Collection. 1995-1996. 0.39 cubic feet (1 box and 1 oversized folder). At University of Washington Libraries, Special Collections. Contains material collected by Bohan as a Service Employees International Union delegate to the AFL-CIO convention that elected John Sweeney president in 1995.
 Jackie Boschok Papers. 1979-2013. 16.32 cubic feet (22 boxes). At University of Washington Libraries, Special Collections.  Contains records from AFL-CIO National Community Services Documents, AFL-CIO Resources, and AFL-CIO Working Women Working Together Conference Records.
 Phil Lelli Papers. 1933-2004. 10.45 cubic feet (11 boxes and 1 vertical file). At University of Washington Libraries, Special Collections. Contains "Principles of Autonomy & Jurisdictional Intergrity within the AFL-CIO".
 George Meany Memorial AFL-CIO Archive. Approximately 40 million documents. At University of Maryland Libraries, Special Collections and University Archives. Contains material that will help researchers better understand pivotal social movements in this country, including those to gain rights for women, children and minorities.
 AFL and AFL-CIO International Affairs Department, AFL Advisors to the United Nations Economic and Social Council records, at the University of Maryland libraries. Contains correspondence between AFL advisors and the United Nations Economic and Social Council.
AFL-CIO Merger Oral History Project collection, at the University of Maryland Libraries. Contains staff oral histories that explores the history of the 1955 merger: its challenges and successes.

 External links 

 
 AFL-CIO at OpenSecrets
 One Hat for Labor? by David Moberg, The Nation, April 29, 2009.
 Labor's Cold War by Tim Shorrock. The Nation'',  May 19, 2003.
AFL-CIO Organization and Field Services Department, International and National Union Charter Files at the University of Maryland Libraries

1955 establishments in the United States
1955 in economics
527 organizations
 
National trade union centers of the United States
Organizations based in Washington, D.C.
Organizations established in 1955
Trade Union Confederation of the Americas